Desnyansky is a rural locality (a settlement) and the administrative center of Utynskoye Rural Settlement, Vygonichsky District, Bryansk Oblast, Russia. The population was 474 as of 2010. There are 6 streets.

Geography 
Desnyansky is located 31 km south of Vygonichi (the district's administrative centre) by road. Uty is the nearest rural locality.

References 

Rural localities in Vygonichsky District